DMU may refer to:

Universities
 Dalian Maritime University, a university located in Dalian, Liaoning, China
 De Montfort University, located in the city of Leicester, England
 Des Moines University, a medical school located in Des Moines, Iowa
 Divine Mercy University, a university located in Arlington, Virginia

Transport
 Diesel multiple unit, a diesel-powered, multiple-unit rail vehicle
 Dimapur Airport, the IATA code for the airport in India

Organisations
 Danmarks Miljøundersøgelser, Danish for National Environmental Research Institute of Denmark
 Durham Miners' Association, a trade union representing miners in North East England

Other
 Decision making unit, in business-to-business sales and marketing (B2B & B2C)
 Digital mockup, a product visualization method and technology used by engineers
 Dimethylurea, a chemical substance produced from Dimethylamine (DMA) and urea
 Drag Make-Up Maneuver, a spacecraft orbital maneuver designed to counteract the effects of atmospheric drag